Aleksander Januszkiewicz (born 7 January 1994 in Poland) is a Polish footballer.

References

Polish footballers
Living people
1994 births
Association football midfielders
GKS Katowice players
Polonia Bytom players
Gwardia Koszalin players
Assyriska FF players